Agustina "Agus" Barroso Basualdo (born 20 May 1993) is an Argentine professional footballer who plays as a centre back for Brazilian Série A1 club SE Palmeiras and the Argentina women's national team.

Club career
Barroso previously played for Fylde Ladies of the English FA Women's Premier League Northern Division.

International career
Barroso represented Argentina at the 2012 FIFA U-20 Women's World Cup. At senior level, she played two Pan American Games editions (2011 and 2015) and two Copa América Femenina editions (2014 and 2018).

Honors and awards

Clubs
UAI Urquiza
Torneo Clausura: 2012
Torneo Final: 2014

Corinthians
Copa Libertadores Femenina: 2017

References
Notes

Citations

External links
 
 
 Agustina Barroso Basualdo at the 2019 Pan American Games
 Profile at Txapeldunak.com 

1993 births
Living people
People from Tandil
Sportspeople from Buenos Aires Province
Argentine women's footballers
Women's association football central defenders
UAI Urquiza (women) players
Associação Ferroviária de Esportes (women) players
Fylde Ladies F.C. players
Madrid CFF players
Sociedade Esportiva Palmeiras (women) players
Campeonato Brasileiro de Futebol Feminino Série A1 players
FA Women's National League players
Primera División (women) players
Argentine expatriate women's footballers
Argentine expatriate sportspeople in Brazil
Expatriate women's footballers in Brazil
Argentine expatriate sportspeople in England
Expatriate women's footballers in England
Argentine expatriate sportspeople in Spain
Expatriate women's footballers in Spain
Argentina women's international footballers
2019 FIFA Women's World Cup players
Pan American Games silver medalists for Argentina
Pan American Games medalists in football
Medalists at the 2019 Pan American Games
Footballers at the 2019 Pan American Games
Footballers at the 2011 Pan American Games
Footballers at the 2015 Pan American Games
South American Games gold medalists for Argentina
South American Games medalists in football
Competitors at the 2014 South American Games